Captain is a 2022 Indian Tamil-language science fiction action film written and directed by Shakti Soundar Rajan and Arya produced the film through his studio The Show People, associating with Think Studios and SNS Movie Production LLP. The film stars Arya, Aishwarya Lekshmi and Simran Rishi Bagga. The film's music is composed by D. Imman, with cinematography handled by S. Yuva and editing done by Pradeep E. Ragav. It is inspired by John McTiernan's film Predator.

The film was scheduled to be released in theatres on 8 September 2022. The film received mixed reviews from critics and audience with praise for Arya's performance, soundtrack, background score, cinematography, concept and some casting, but criticism for its story, screenplay, VFX and direction.

Plot 
Vetriselvan, an Indian Army Captain is an orphan who is raised in the army school. His only family is his teammates which comprises Karuna, Sheikh, Rekha and Karthi Devan. The team is famous for its unity and covert missions. They are assigned a mission to investigate a particular area in the forest, Sector-42. The area earlier had a mineral factory during the East India Company rule. Due to a high amount of unusual activity happening in this area for the past 50 years, nobody has dared to set foot in the area. A team of soldiers who were sent to the area to investigate earlier never return. Vetri and his team visit Sector 42, but an unknown creature attacks them, making them unconscious. 

After gaining consciousness, Vetri discovers that Karthi is trying to shoot himself and sees all of his team members unconscious. When Vetri tells Karthi not to shoot himself, he shoots him in the shoulder and dies. This incident becomes a black mark on Vetri's character since he refuses to blame Karthi and takes the sole blame for the failed operation. Karthi is branded as a traitor and is not given a military funeral which deeply upsets Vetri. Because of his refusal to blame Karthi for the operation, Vetri is handed a punishment posting as a training officer. Dr Keerthi is a scientist who is working for the defense ministry on the Minotaur project. The unnamed creature which is present in Sector-42 is called "Minotaur," an extremely dangerous cold-blooded creature that doesn't have any body temperature. They spit venom on people making them unconscious and some of them go berserk after having eye contact.

They communicate with each other by emitting bio radio signals with the help of spiders. Keerthi, with the help of Vikram, a rich spoilt brat who is funding Keerthi establishes a lab just near Sector-42 to study the happenings of Minotaurs and their threat. Since Vetri's team was the last one which visits Sector-42, they are chosen by Dr. Keerthi for the mission despite reservations from General Bala who despises Vetri after he refuses to take Karthi's blame for the earlier operation. The mission commences, and the Minotaurs manage to attack everyone except Vetri, who is conscious. Vetri almost kills a Minotaur with a bomb and brings it into the lab. Since the Minotaur is unconscious and not dead, the Minotaur still sends the signal to the spider and is awakened. 

The Minotaur almost destroys the lab and kills a soldier who became berserk after coming into contact with the Minotaur. Realizing that Minotaurs attack in open spaces and emit bio radio signals through spiders, the next day the team along with Keerthi travel in an army tank. Since there are multiple Minotaurs, Vetri and Keerthi deduce that a huge Minotaur is present and emitting signals to the smaller Minotaurs. They install devices around the forest to get the location of the huge Minotaur and just as they are close to the location they are blinded by one of the Minotaurs except for Vetri, who is conscious. Keerthi finds that Minotaurs are sensitive to morphine from a blood sample she retrieved from Vetri. After noticing suspicious activities, Vetri finally reveals to his team that they would kill the huge Minotaur in the wee hours of the morning without Keerthi. 

The team are shocked that Vetri said that they didn't find the location of the huge Minotaur, but he says that they actually know it and do not remember because of the Minotaur attack. Vetri reveals that they had found the place of the huge Minotaur which is situated in a water body near the old factory. After visiting the factory, Vetri sees a lot of corpses and Vikram's company's helicopter on the premises and holds Keerthi at gunpoint, who reveals that they wanted to open Sector-42 to extract rare minerals which are not available in any place and a team sent by Vikram's company entered Sector-42 without permission to restore the factory. The Minotaurs killed all the people working in the factory since during restoration they released polluted water into the streams which awakened the Minotaurs who felt threatened. Vetri also reveals that Karthi had consumed Morphine since he was injured during a past mission. 

In their first Mission at Sector-42, Karthi actually saved all of his teammates' lives including Vetri's from Minotaurs but couldn't save his own since he was in close contact with them. The team then proceeds to kill the huge Minotaur without Keerthi. During the search at the factory, Vetri finds a mobile phone in which a scientist recorded vlogs of all the happenings in the factory. he sends that as a piece of confidential evidence to General Bala, who then knows about the ulterior motives of Keerthi and Vikram and also learns the reason why Vetri did not blame Karthi for the failed operation. Vetri and his team reach the location of the huge Minotaur where they initially trick Keerthi, General Bala, and Vikram into believing that Vetri has become berserk and has killed his teammates, but they all use training bullets. 

Vetri is then attacked by the huge Minotaur through which he learns about the Minotaur's next generation was actually being safeguarded. Vetri somehow kills the huge Minotaur after almost drowning to death and finishes the operation. Although the Minotaurs are killed, Keerthi and Vikram's motive is foiled by Vetri and General Bala when they lie about not killing the Minotaur. Since Sector-42 is a dangerous area, the army orders it to completely shut it with civilian activity prohibited. Vetri is reinstated in the field and Karthi is given a funeral with full honors. Vetri finally learns that his love interest Kavya was actually Karthi's sister and fell in love with him since Karthi promised his family in a letter that he would present and talk to his family only after his name was cleared. In the post-credits scene, a seemingly new race of Minotaurs are awakening underwater, emitting bio radio signals implying that they will return.

Cast

Arya as Captain Vetriselvan
Aishwarya Lekshmi as Kavya, Vetriselvan's love interest and Karthi Devan's sister
Simran as Dr. Keerthi
Kavya Shetty as Rekha, Vetri's teammate
Harish Uthaman as Karthi Devan, Vetri's teammate and Kavya's brother
Bharath Raj as Sheikh, Vetri's teammate 
Gokulnath as Karuna, Vetri's teammate
Malavika Avinash as Major Kavitha Nair 
Vincent Asokan as Major Krishnamoorthy
Adithya Menon as General Bala
Suresh Chandra Menon as Defence Minister S. Rajiv Chakravarthy
Rajmohan as Scientist
Gokul Anand as Vikram

Production
The film was tentatively titled Arya33. On 18 November 2021, the film's official title was unveiled as Captain with Shakti Sounder Rajan as the director, which marks his second collaboration with Arya after Teddy. Aishwarya Lekshmi was cast in as the female lead opposite Arya, which marks their first collaboration while other actors and actresses like Simran, Harish Uthaman, Kavya Shetty and Gokul Anand appear in other pivotal roles. Principal photography of the film began on 25 October 2021 and wrapped up on 13 February 2022.

Music

D. Imman composed the soundtrack and background score of the film while collaborating with Arya for the third time after Vasuvum Saravananum Onna Padichavanga and Teddy and Director Shakti Soundar Rajan for the fourth time after Miruthan, Tik Tik Tik and Teddy. On June 10, music director and singer Yuvan Shankar Raja announced that he will be singing for one of the songs in the film. The aforementioned track was titled "Ninaivugal" that was released as a single on  25 July 2022. The second single "Kylaa" was released on 11 August 2022. The third single "Akkrinai Naan" was released on 26 August 2022. The last single "You Are A Fighter" was released on 5 September 2022. The entire soundtrack album was released on 7 September 2022.

Release

Theatrical
The film was released in theatres on 8 September 2022. The distribution rights of the film in Tamil Nadu were acquired by Udhayanidhi Stalin under the banner of Red Giant Movies.

Home media
The post-theatrical streaming and satellite rights of the film are bagged by ZEE5 and Zee Tamil. The film was digitally streamed on ZEE5 on 30 September 2022.

Reception

Critical reception 
M. Suganth of The Times of India gave the film 2 stars out of 5, stating that, "The same can be said of the film, too - an underwhelming, underwritten action movie". Janani K of India Today rated the film 2 out of 5 stars and wrote "Captain is an underwritten film which needed much more substance and attention to detail to capture the audience." Kirubhakar Purushothaman of The Indian Express rated the film 2 out of 5 stars and wrote "Captain is not as excruciating as director Shakti Soundar Rajan’s previous ventures like Miruthan or Tik Tik Tik, but those are just poor yardsticks to measure films". Siby Jeyya of the India Herald said, "Crisp, potent music and sound really add to the experience. Although the acting is little, it is necessary for the tale in terms of context". Bhavana Sharma of Pinkvilla who gave 3 stars out out of 5 stars after reviewing the film stated that, "Despite a few silly points, this film is worth watching for an adrenaline rush". Sowmya Rajendran of The News Minute gave the film’s rating 1.5 out of 5 stars and wrote "The film is just under two hours long, but it feels like an age by the time it comes to an end."

References

External links
 
Captain on ZEE5

Films scored by D. Imman
2022 films
2022 science fiction action films
Indian science fiction action films
Indian Army in films
2020s Tamil-language films